Escadrille Spa.561 (also variously known as Escadrille N.92, Escadrille N.392, Escadrille N.561) was a French First World War fighter squadron dedicated to defending Venice, Italy from aerial attack. Stemming from a six plane detachment assigned to Venice's defense on 15 August 1915, after its foundation in June 1916, Escadrille Spa. 561 would defend Venice until 1 January 1918. Detached then to support the French X Armee during its sojourn in Italy, the squadron remained on the peninsula after the X Armee had returned to France. By war's end, Escadrille Spa.561 was credited with destroying 12 enemy aircraft and four observation balloons.

History
Escadrille Spa.561 stemmed from  an aviation detachment posted at Mestre, Italy on 15 August 1915 for the defense of Venice. Its original inventory was six aircraft. In December 1915, the unit relocated to Lido; moving nearer Venice made it easier to defend it. In June 1916, the squadron's name was dubbed Escadrille N.92; the unit's designation denotes a Nieuport airplane inventory. Then, for no discernible reason, it was redesignated as Escadrille N.392.

By the beginning of 1917, the escadrille had 18 airplanes on hand. On 1 July 1917, the squadron was renumbered Escadrille N.561. On 1 January 1918, the squadron was attached to X Armee for their Italian operations. After X Armee returned to France, Escadrille N.561 remained in Italy, though at reduced strength. In April 1918, it had 10 Nieuports.

It can be inferred that by some date after April 1918, the squadron had re-equipped with SPADs, as it ended the war as Escadrille Spa.561. Whatever the unit's name or aircraft, by war's' end it was credited with destruction of 12 enemy aircraft, as well as four observation balloons shot down.

Commanding officers

 Capitaine de Challeronge: 15 August 1915 - war's end

Notable members

 Sergeant André Robert Lévy

Aircraft
 Nieuports?: 15 August 1915
  Nieuports: June 1916 
 Early 1917 inventory:
 Sixteen Nieuports
 One SPAD
 One Sopwith
 Ten Nieuports: April 1918
  SPADs: After April 1918

End notes

Reference
 Franks, Norman; Bailey, Frank (1993). Over the Front: The Complete Record of the Fighter Aces and Units of the United States and French Air Services, 1914–1918 London, UK: Grub Street Publishing. .

Squadrons of the French Service Aéronautique in World War I
Military units and formations established in 1915
Military units and formations disestablished in 1918